William Joseph Connor (April 8, 1899 – December 14, 1980) was a professional American football player who spent two seasons in the National Football League (NFL), with the Boston Bulldogs in 1929 and the Newark Tornadoes in 1930.

References

1899 births
1980 deaths
American football guards
American football tackles
Boston Bulldogs (NFL) players
Catholic University Cardinals football players
Newark Tornadoes players
University of Rhode Island alumni
Players of American football from Providence, Rhode Island